Switched at Birth is an American television drama series which premiered on ABC Family on June 6, 2011. Created by Lizzy Weiss, the series follows two teenage girls who learn that they were switched at birth. On August 17, 2012, ABC Family renewed Switched at Birth for a second season, which premiered on January 7, 2013. All of the episode titles take their names from pieces of artwork. On July 30, 2013, ABC Family renewed the series for a full 22-episode third season, which premiered in January 2014. The second half of season 3 premiered on June 16, 2014. On August 13, 2014, the series was renewed for a fourth season, which premiered on January 6, 2015. ABC Family, which changed its name to Freeform in January 2016, announced on Wednesday October 21, 2015, that it had renewed the series for a fifth and final season. The fifth season began airing on January 31, 2017, and concluded on April 11, 2017.

Series overview

Episodes

Season 1 (2011–12)

Season 2 (2013)

Season 3 (2014)

Season 4 (2015)

Season 5 (2017)

Ratings

References

External links 
 List of Switched at Birth episodes at TheFutoncritic.com
 List of Switched at Birth episodes at MSN TV

Lists of American teen drama television series episodes
Episodes